Jean Kerr (born Bridget Jean Collins, July 10, 1922 – January 5, 2003) was an Irish-American author and playwright born in Scranton, Pennsylvania, who authored the 1957 bestseller Please Don't Eat the Daisies and the plays King of Hearts in 1954 and Mary, Mary in 1961.

Early life and education
Kerr was born in Scranton, Pennsylvania, to Tom and Kitty Collins, and grew up on Electric Street in Scranton. She attended Marywood Seminary, the topic of her humorous short story "When I was Queen of the May."  She received a bachelor's degree from Marywood College in Scranton and later attended The Catholic University of America, where she received her master's degree and met then-professor Walter Kerr. She later married Kerr, who became a New York drama critic, and they had six children—Christopher, twins Colin and John, Gilbert, Gregory, and Kitty. 

The Kerrs bought a home in New Rochelle, New York, and later settled in Larchmont, New York.  Their life in suburbia provided grist for her columns and the book, Please Don't Eat the Daisies. The marriage lasted until his death in 1996. She died in White Plains, New York, of pneumonia, in 2003.

Career 
The Kerrs worked together on several projects, including a 1946 adaptation of the novel, The Song of Bernadette. They contributed lyrics and sketches to the  musical Touch and Go (1949), and co-authored  Goldilocks (1958), a Broadway musical comedy about the early days of silent film that ran from October 11, 1958, to February 28, 1959, and won two Tony Awards, for best actress in a featured role (Pat Stanley) and best actor in a featured role (Russell Nype). The Kerrs also collaborated on the Tony Award-winning King of Hearts (1954), which ran for 279 performances: He directed the play that she co-wrote with Eleanor Brooke. King of Hearts was adapted for the screen in 1956 under the title That Certain Feeling. The film starred Bob Hope.

Jean Kerr wrote Jenny Kissed Me, which was produced in December 1948. She wrote the hit comedy Mary, Mary, which ran on Broadway from 1961 through 1964, for 1,572 performances, and was brought to the screen under the same title in a 1963 film starring Debbie Reynolds and Barry Nelson. It was a really big hit at that time :). 

Meanwhile, her prolific writing for such magazines as John MurrayAnderson's Almanac (1953–1954) made her a household name. Collections of her articles became best-sellers, starting with her best-known book,  Please Don't Eat the Daisies (1957). The 1960 film version starred Doris Day and David Niven; NBC television aired  a 58-episode situation comedy starring Pat Crowley from 1965 to 1967. Another collection, The Snake Has All the Lines (1960), followed.

Kerr's  play Finishing Touches ran from February to July 1973. Her other works include the plays Poor Richard (1964) and Lunch Hour (1980). She also wrote the books Penny Candy (1970) and How I Got to Be Perfect (1978). Her last play, Lunch Hour, was staged in 1980.

Books 
 Please Don't Eat the Daisies (1957)
 The Snake has all the Lines (1960)
 Penny Candy (1970)
 How I Got to Be Perfect (1979)

Plays 
 The Song of Bernadette (1946)
 Our Hearts Were Young and Gay (1946)
 Jenny Kissed Me (1948)
 Touch-and-Go (1949)
 John Murray Anderson's Almanac (1953)
 King of Hearts  (1954)
 Goldilocks: A Musical (1958)
 Mary, Mary (1961)
 Poor Richard (1964)
 Finishing Touches (1973)
 Lunch Hour'' (1980)

References 
Notes

External links 

 Walter and Jean Kerr Papers at the Wisconsin Center for Film and Theater Research
 Life Magazine Images:Walter & Jean Kerr
 
 
  Includes photo slideshow of the house.
 

1922 births
2003 deaths
Marywood University alumni
20th-century American dramatists and playwrights
Catholic University of America alumni
Writers from Scranton, Pennsylvania
Writers from New Rochelle, New York
People from Larchmont, New York
Laetare Medal recipients
American women dramatists and playwrights
20th-century American women writers
American people of Irish descent
Catholics from New York (state)
Catholics from Pennsylvania
21st-century American women